Kabbala may refer to:

Kabbalah, a religious philosophical system claiming an insight into divine nature
Sefer ha-Qabbalah, a chronicle of the Jewish people by Abraham ibn Daud
Kabbala Denudata, a book from Christian Knorr von Rosenroth (1636–1689), a Christian Hebraist
Kabbala, Chitradurga, a village in Karnataka, India

See also
Cabala (disambiguation)